The Lorain Fire Station No. 1, at 605 W. Fourth St. in Lorain, Ohio, was built in 1912.  It was listed on the National Register of Historic Places in 1987.

It was built after a fire killed four persons, including a woman and two children.

References

Fire stations on the National Register of Historic Places in Ohio
National Register of Historic Places in Lorain County, Ohio
Colonial Revival architecture in Ohio
Fire stations completed in 1912
1912 establishments in Ohio
Buildings and structures in Lorain, Ohio